Ulverstone is a town on the northern coast of Tasmania, Australia on the mouth of the River Leven, on Bass Strait.

As of June 2021 Ulverstone had an urban population of 11,613, being the largest town in Tasmania. The town is a part of the municipality of the Central Coast Council which also includes Penguin, Turners Beach, Leith, Gawler and surrounds, and Forth.

History
 
The town area was first settled by Europeans in 1848, when Andrew Risby, his wife Louisa and their five young children arrived to settle and develop farmland from what was mostly a thickly forested wilderness.

Andrew & Louisa arrived in Adelaide, South Australia in 1839 as a newly married couple from their ancestral town of Horsley, Gloucestershire in England.  The first of their five children were born in Adelaide.  Soon after the birth of their 2nd child they moved to Tasmania.  In 1841 they arrived at the Forth River where a young 19-year-old James Fenton had pioneered just prior to their arrival.  After clearing land and subsistence farming for a few years, they were evicted from their "patch" after a land dispute with a wealthy speculator and moved westward.  The district was, at that time, known as 'the Leven' and recognised as a good source of quality timber with a similar climate to England. When their 5th child, Andrew Risby jnr. was just 2 years old the Risby family moved and settled on a patch of land known as The Rises, at the south-eastern perimeter of the present day Ulverstone town boundary where they farmed for many years.  Descendants of this pioneering family still live in the district.

During the 1850s, the district received a few new settlers but was also frequented by transient timber getters. The timber found ready markets in Melbourne, which desperately required good quality split timber during the Victorian gold rush. Until June 1854, land releases in the district were often purchased under 'pre-emptive rights legislation' by distant purchasers whose intention was to keep the land for later sale at an increased price. With the repeal of that legislation, the conditions for settlers to take up residence improved.

The name Ulverstone is first known to have been used in 1854 when Hugh Ross McKay opened the Ulverstone store. Leven Post Office opened on 30 May 1857 and was renamed Ulverstone Post Office in 1881. Ulverstone was declared a town on 22 February 1861 by Governor H.E. Fox-Young.

Reliable rainfall and generally good quality soils favoured the development of agricultural pursuits. The early pioneers of the district struggled against great odds to secure their sustenance and ultimately develop an income from sale of their produce.

Ulverstone grew quite quickly during the 1890s, and the town has become a centralised location between the north-west coast's two cities, Burnie and Devonport. It is named after Ulverston in England, which also sits at the estuary of a river called Leven. Ulverston in England was spelled Ulverstone until late in the 19th century.

From 1915 until 1955, a branch railway ran from Ulverstone to Nietta, mostly carrying timber for the Burnie Pulp Mill.

Redevelopment

The Central Coast Council has recently redeveloped the area to increase tourism. 2010 saw the completion of a new basketball stadium, the Schweppes Arena. The arena holds around 1,100 people, cost $5.5 million to build and was completed just behind schedule. it overlooks the River Leven and is situated just behind the former stadium.

In 2011, the Leven Bridge was replaced by a new bridge. It was built by VEC Civil Engineering for approximately $6.5 million, with the Department of Infrastructure, Energy and Resources and the Central Coast Council funding the project. In June 2011 a walking track between Turners Beach and Ulverstone was opened.

A redevelopment of the wharf precinct was opened to the public on 17 November 2012.

Education
Ulverstone has three public primary schools and one public high school/college. 
East Ulverstone Primary School
Central Ulverstone Primary School
West Ulverstone Primary School
Ulverstone Secondary College
There are two private schools in Ulverstone.
Sacred Heart Primary School
Leighland Christian School 

As of 2017, students studying Years 11 and 12 can study at Ulverstone Secondary College, or commute to Penguin District School in Penguin, to Don College in Devonport, or to Hellyer College in Burnie.

Ulverstone is home to TastroFest - Tasmania's Astronomy Festival. This event is held annually in August and is the largest astronomy festival in Australia. Centred around education, this event holds both student and public programs over three days.

Notable people
Nita Burke (born 1937), Australian basketball representative
Joseph Lyons, Prime Minister of Australia from 1932 to 1939, spent some of his early years living in Ulverstone - he arrived with his family from Stanley at age 5 and attended school, but his family relocated back to Stanley when Joseph was 12.
Richard Fromberg, tennis player
Ben Hilfenhaus, Australian national and state cricketer
Frank MacDonald, last-surviving Tasmanian veteran of World War I
David Neitz, Australian rules footballer
Alex Pearce, Australian rules footballer
Tammy Tyrell, federal senator
Craig Walton, triathlete and coach

See also
West Ulverstone, Tasmania

References

 
Localities of Central Coast Council (Tasmania)
Towns in Tasmania
North West Tasmania